The Ministry of Infrastructure is a ministry responsible for public infrastructure in the Canadian province of Ontario. The current minister is Kinga Surma.

It is currently responsible for two crown agencies: Waterfront Toronto and Infrastructure Ontario (which was merged with the Ontario Realty Corporation in 2011).

History 

The maintenance and management of public infrastructure has consistently been a key function of the government since well before Confederation.  

The Board of Works in the Province of Upper Canada was responsible for superintending, managing and controlling public works in the province. It was merged with a similar board in Lower Canada in 1841. The board was replaced in 1846 by the commissioners of public works who were responsible for "managing and controlling the construction, maintenance and repair of all canals, harbours, roads or parts of roads, bridges, slides, and other public works and buildings".  Although legislations did not specifically designate the office of the commissioners as the Department of Public Works, that is how the commissioners refer to it in their first annual report. 

At Confederation in 1867, responsibility for public works in Ontario was taken over by the Department of Public Works for Ontario, administered by the Commissioner of Agriculture and Public Works.  In 1874, legislation was passed establishing a standalone commissioner to be responsible for the Department of Public Works. From 1896 to 1900 the Provincial Instructor in Road-Making was under the department.

In 1900, both the Office of the Commissioner of Highways and the Bureau of Labour were established as part of the Department of Public Works. In 1914, the Office of the Commissioner of Highways (by then renamed the Highways Branch), was elevated to Department status, becoming the Department of Public Highways. Similarly, by 1919, the Bureau of Labour had become the Department of Labour. Also in 1900, the Colonization Roads Branch was transferred to the Department of Public Works. Formerly with the Department of Crown Lands and responsible for constructing and repairing roads in sparsely settled areas of the province, this Branch was transferred to the Department of Lands, Forests and Mines in 1919.

The Department of Public Works continued to exist until 1972, when the government was considerably re-organized as the various Departments were restructured and renamed as Ministries. The Ministry of Government Services was created, assuming most of the functions of the former Department of Public Works, including the functions of constructing and maintaining government buildings. 

In 1987, the Realty Group was formed within the Ministry of Government Services to provide accommodation and real estate services for the Ontario Government. In 1993, The Ontario Realty Corporation was established as the successor entity to the Realty Group, the Ontario Mortgage Corporation, and the Ontario Land Corporation. It was established as a Crown corporation and reported through the Management Board Secretariat.  The Ministry of Government Services also ceased to exist in 1993, transferring most of its corporate services function, including buildings and facilities management, to the Management Board Secretariat.
 
In 2003, the Ministry of Public Infrastructure Renewal was created out of the winding-up of the Ontario Superbuild Corporation, inheriting its advisory and policy development and coordination responsibilities. Between 2003 and 2008, it assumed oversight of various agencies including the Smart Growth Secretariat, Ontario Lottery and Gaming Corporation, Ontario Realty Corporation, Infrastructure Ontario, and Liquor Control Board of Ontario.

Between 2008 and 2010, the Ministry was briefly merged with the Ministry of Energy to form the Ministry of Energy and Infrastructure. Between 2014 and 2016, it was again briefly merged, this time with the Economic Development Ministry to form the Ministry of Economic Development, Employment and Infrastructure.

List of Ministers

References

External links
 Ontario Ministry of Infrastructure
 Ontario Ministry of Public Infrastructure Renewal (archived copy)

Infrastructure
Ontario